SS-Oberführer Ernst Boepple (30 November 1887 – 15 December 1950) was a Nazi official and SS officer, serving as deputy to Josef Bühler in occupied Poland during World War II and the Holocaust, who was executed for war crimes.

Life
Boepple earned his Abitur in 1905 at the Gymnasium in Reutlingen. Then he studied languages and history at several universities: University of Tübingen, University of Paris, University of Oxford, and the 
University of London and earned his PhD in 1915.—with the doctoral thesis: Frederick the Great's Relation to Württemberg. He fought in the First World War in the infantry and left the German Army with the rank of first lieutenant (Oberleutnant) in 1919.

Director of Nazi publishing enterprise
Boepple became a co-worker of the publisher Julius Friedrich Lehmann and was one of the founders of the German Workers' Party (DAP). In 1919 he took over the Deutsche Volksverlag publishing house, which had been established by Lehmann. There he  published Anton Drexler's My Political Awakening. The Deutsche Volksverlag published a large section of the early formative Nazi literature including:
 Wilhelm Meister: Jewry's debt-book - a German accounting, 1919 (Judas Schuldbuch - eine deutsche Abrechnung)
 Minister Karl Gerecke: Biblical anti-Semitism: Jewry's character in world history, guilt and the end in prophet Jona's reflection, 1920 (Biblischer Antisemitismus. Der Juden weltgeschichtlicher Charakter, Schuld und Ende in des Propheten Jona Judenspiegel)
 Maria Groener: Schopenhauer and the Jews, 1920 (Schopenhauer und die Juden)
 Dr. Hans Grunsky: Richard Wagner and the Jews, 1920 (Richard Wagner und die Juden)
 Alfred Rosenberg: Immorality in the Talmud, 1920 (Unmoral im Talmud)
 Emil Kloth: Soul searching - Reflections of a social democratic trade unionist about the politics of social democracy, 1920 (Einkehr - Betrachtungen eines sozialdemokratischen Gewerkschaftlers über die Politik der deutschen Sozialdemokratie)
 Dr. Paul Tafel: The new Germany. A socialist state on a national foundation, 1920 (Das neue Deutschland. Ein Rätestaat auf nationaler Grundlage)
 Fridrich Andersen (one of the founders of the German Christians): The German Saviour, 1921 (Der deutsche Heiland)
 Dietrich Eckart, Otto von Kursell: Austria under Jewry's star, Russia's gravedigger, 1921 (Österreich unter Judas Stern, Totengräber Russlands)
 Dr. Max Maurenbrecher: Goethe and the Jews, 1921 (Goethe und die Juden)
 Dr. Alfred Falb: Luther and the Jews, 1921 (Luther und die Juden)
 Hugo Christoph Meyer: The Jew and his Slavery, 1921 (Der Jude und sein Sklaventum)
 Ottokar Stauf von der March: Jewry in the Opinions of the Ages, 1921 (Die Juden im Urteil der Zeiten)
 Otto Armin: The Jews in the War-Business and the War-Economics, 1921 (Die Juden in den Kriegs-Gesellschaften und in der Kriegs-Wirtschaft)
 Adolf Bartels: Hebbel and the Jews, 1922 (Hebbel und die Juden)
 Alfred Rosenberg: Being, principles, and goals of the National Socialist German Worker's Party, 1922 (Wesen, Grundsätze und Ziele der Nationalsozialistischen Deutschen Arbeiterpartei)
 Dr. Albrecht Wirth: Crosswise our present time, 1922 (Quer durch die Gegenwart)
 Alfred Rosenberg: The Plague in Russia. Bolshevism, its heads, henchmen, and victims, 1922 (Pest in Russland. Der Bolschewismus, seine Häupter, Handlanger und Opfer)
 Alfred Rosenberg: Bolshevism, hunger, death, 1922 (Bolschewismus, Hunger, Tod)

In November 1923 Ernst Boepple took part in the Beer Hall Putsch.

World War II
When Hans Schemm died after an aircraft crash, Boepple became the Bavarian Minister for Culture until the invasion of Poland in 1939. In 1940 he again served in the military. On 1 September 1941 he was appointed the State Secretary of the General Government in occupied Poland, serving as deputy to Deputy Governor Josef Bühler. Boepple was deeply implicated in the Final Solution as the deputy to Bühler and also held rank in the SS, being an SS-Oberführer (senior colonel).

Several months after Germany's surrender, Boepple was arrested by U.S. soldiers in Bavaria. He was extradited to Poland in 1947, where he was sentenced to death by a Polish court on 14 December 1949. Boepple and hanged on 15 December 1950.

Publications
Friedrich des Großen Verhältnis zu Württemberg (i.e. Frederick the Great's Relation to Württemberg), Dissertation, C. A. Seyfried, 1915
Die Judenfrage und der deutsche Buchhandel (i.e. The Jewish Question and the German book trade), Deutscher Volksverlag, 1920
Zwischen Front und Heimat: Zum Vierjahrestag des Generalgouvernements (i.e. Between Front and Homeland: Fourth Anniversary of the General Government), Pressechef d. Regierg d. Generalgouvernements, 1943

References

1887 births
1950 deaths
Executed people from Baden-Württemberg
German Army personnel of World War I
German Workers Party members
Nazi Party politicians
Holocaust perpetrators in Poland
Nazis who participated in the Beer Hall Putsch
Nazis executed by Poland by hanging
People from Reutlingen
People from the Kingdom of Württemberg
Prisoners and detainees of the United States military
SS-Oberführer
People extradited to Poland